The Music Trades is a -year-old American trade magazine that covers a broad spectrum of music and music commerce, domestically and abroad. Founded in New York City in 1890, it has been based in Englewood, New Jersey, since the mid-1970s. The Music Trades is one of the oldest continuously published trade publications in the world. A controlling ownership over the last  years —  percent of the publication's total age — has been held by three generations of the Majeski family; few publications have been as long closely held by a single family.

History

Freund and Weil: 1890-1927 
The Music Trades was founded in 1890 by John Christian Freund (1848–1924) and Milton Weil (1871–1935). Eight years later, they founded Musical America, the oldest American magazine on classical music.

John Christian Freund 
Freund, who matriculated in 1868 at Exeter College, Oxford, but left after three years without a degree, had first been a playwright and actor. He emigrated to New York in 1871.  In 1875, he founded The Music Trade Review, a fortnightly publication that he later renamed The Musical and Dramatic Times and Music Trade Review.  The publication ran for about two years.  In 1878, Freund founded the Musical Times, soon renamed the Musical and Dramatic Times. On January 7, 1882, Freund launched a weekly magazine, Music: A Review, which contained an insert called The Music Trade. Sometime on or before July 8, 1882, Freund changed the magazine's name to Music and Drama, supplemented by Freund's Daily Music and Drama. Music and Drama evolved into The Music Trades.

In 1884, Freund and John Travis Quigg (1839–1893) co-founded The American Musician, which during its seven-year run became the official publication of the National League of Musicians union, the forerunner of the American Federation of Musicians.  Before founding the American Musician, Henry Cood Watson (1818–1875) began in 1864 the publication Watson's Art Journal, devoted to music criticism and trade.  Watson died in 1875 and his Journal was taken over by his pupil, William M. Thoms, who improved it, renamed it American Art Journal, edited it until his retirement in 1906, then, upon his retirement, merged it with the American Musician.

Around 1895, Freund's younger brother, Harry Edward Freund (1863–1950), was editor of Musical Weekly, which continued as a weekly with a new name, beginning January 1896, as The Musical Age.  The publication was aimed at piano dealers.

Legacy of Freund and Weil 
Freund and Weil were exponents of American classical music, although Freund had become a naturalized United States citizen on November 2, 1903.  Their publications Musical America and The Music Trades complemented each other, and gave their editors a unique view of the growth of classical music in America and its international rank, as an art form and in commerce.  Both publications reached an international readership. Freund and Weil held sway as impresarios and movement leaders of American classical music.  Their publications flourished during the early 1900s — on a new wave of American composers, including those of the Second New England School — joined by foreign composers who emigrated to America in a flood of nearly 25 million Europeans after 1880.  In commerce, 1875 to 1932 represented a golden age of piano making — nearly 364,545 were sold at the peak in 1909, according to the National Piano Manufacturers Association, notably in New York City and Chicago.

Freund and Weil's publications gave them broad access in the field of music. They served as bridges between the art and the money, connecting artists, organizations, commerce, and public policy.  The spectrum that both publications collectively chronicled gave Freund and Weil a strong platform to serve as advocates, opinion leaders, conciliators, counselors, arbiters, and ambassadors for music and the music trades in America. As an example, Freund and Weil helped found the National Music Managers Association (for national managers) and the National Concert Managers' Association (for local managers), aimed at improving cooperation between the two for the benefit of musicians.  In 1918, Freund and Weil helped found the Musical Alliance of the United States, an organization that endures today. Weil served as founding secretary-treasurer, while Freund, the founding president, called upon the group to organize "all workers in the field, from the man at the bench in a piano factory to the conductor of the great symphony."

Trade Publications: 1927-29
On June 13, 1927, three years after Freund died, Weil put The Music Trades and Musical America up for sale. 

One bid came from John Francis Majeski, Sr. (1892–1971), who in 1910 had joined the staff of Musical America and become Weil's assistant. Majeski offered a quarter-million dollars for the pair, but was outbid by a new syndicate that also acquired four other publications (The American Architect, The Barbers' Journal, Beauty Culture, and Perfumers' Journal) and consolidated them all into a new company called Trade Publications, Inc.

The deal was handled by investment bankers Schluter & Company and Shields & Company, which issued $1,100,000 in preferred and common stock. Shields & Company and Nixon & Company, of Philadelphia, also made a public offering of ten-year  percent gold bonds of Trade Publications, that carried warrants to purchase common stock at a price that closely corresponded with the value of the stock.

Trade Publication's officers included Walter Crawford Howey (1882–1954), president; Verne Hardin Porter (1888–1942), vice president and secretary; and Edwin John Rosencrans (1870–1935), treasurer. The board of directors included these three plus G. Murray Hulbert, John Zollikoffer Lowe, Jr. (1884–1951), and Joseph Urban. Howey and Porter had been executives of the Hearst Corporation.  Rosencrans, a civil engineer, was the managing editor of The American Architect; years earlier, he and architect John F. Jackson (1867–1948) had a partnership that designed more than 70 YMCAs.  Lowe, a lawyer, had been a partner in a law firm with Samuel Seabury.  

Howey, who had been the founding managing editor of the New York Daily Mirror, left Trade Publications on August 1, 1928, to retake his old job.

1929 bankruptcy 
The following year, Trade Publications filed for bankruptcy. The Irving Trust Co. was appointed receiver for the company, which had liabilities of $716,839 and assets of $59,511. 

On July 19, 1929, bankruptcy referee John Logan Lyttle (1879–1930) oversaw the auction of the magazines. Majeski, Weil's former assistant, bought four of the six for $45,200: Musical America, The Music Trades, The Barbers' Journal, and Beauty Culture. About $11,000 of the total went for Musical America and The Music Trades, the publications for which Majeski had offered a quarter-million dollars three years earlier. The acquisition included the publications' names, a collection of back issues, and a few months of office space in the Steinway Building.

A few months before the bankruptcy auction, Weil was said to have sold his interest in Trade Publications for $200,000 in preferred stock. He and his wife—Henrietta Lander ( Rich; 1874–1935)—then moved to Paris with $5,000. Weil's father, Jacob A. Weil (1835–1913), was a Paris-born American and his mother, Dina ( Lilienthal; born 1843), was a German-born American.

Double suicide of Milton and Henrietta Weil 

The bankruptcy sale wiped out Weil's stake, built up over a lifetime. Distraught over the loss of their fortune during the pre-Crash of 1929, then the Crash, and their subsequent inability to recover during the Great Depression, Milton and Henrietta Weil carried out a double suicide pact on May 22, 1935, leaving a note and taking the barbiturate Veronal in their room of the Hotel Scribe in the Opera District of Paris.  Henrietta died the next morning, May 23, 7:40  at the American Hospital; Milton died 23 hours and 25 minutes later, May 24, 7:05 , at the same hospital.  They are buried next to each other at the New Cemetery of Neuilly-sur-Seine.

The Majeski years: 1929–present 

On August 22, 1929, some five weeks after Majeski acquired the publications at bankruptcy auction, he formed three holding companies: The Music Trades Corporation, for The Music Trades; The Musical America Corporation, for Musical America, and Beauty Culture Publishing Corporation, for Barbers Journal and Beauty Culture.

In 1959, Majeski sold Musical America—which would merge with High Fidelity in 1964—but retained his interest in The Musical Trades, and served as its publisher until his death in 1971. The publisher's job was taken over by his son, John Francis Majeski, Jr. (1921–2011), who was already the magazine's editor.  The younger Majeski served as editor until 1982 and publisher until 1985.  

In 2005, he received the American Music Conference Lifetime Achievement Award for his achievements, contribution to music, and long tenure as editor of The Music Trades.

Current ownership
As of 2022, the Majeski family continues its  year ownership of The Music Trades through its holding company, a New Jersey entity based in Englewood. Paul Anton Majeski (born 1960), has been publisher since 1985, and Brian T. Majeski (born 1956), editor since 1982.  Paul holds a bachelor's degree in accounting from Ohio Wesleyan University (1982) and Brian holds a bachelor's degree in philosophy from Lawrence University (1978).

Selected editors and publishers

Selected articles, quotes, and reviews 
Articles and quotes

 Vol. 21, No. 21, May 25, 1901: Responding to a 1901 campaign by the National Musicians Union against ragtime, [the campaign is] "rather quixotic.  There are ears to which "rag-time" is more fascinating than grand opera, and ears of this sort are more numerous"
 "Too Many Piano Factories in Chicago," by Philip J. Meahl (1865–1933), Vol. 23, No. 1, January 4, 1902, pg. 13: "There is some likelihood of the piano manufacturing business being overdone"
 "Succeeded Without Being a "Catalog Dealer,'", by Bert Aaron Rose (1866–1940), Vol. 64, No. 26, December 23, 1922, pg. 32: The author, owner of the Metropolitan Music Co. in Minneapolis and director of bands at the University of Minnesota, illuminates the threat of catalog sales, similar to early 21st-century concerns over online sales vs. physical stores
 "First Selmer Silver Saxophone is Pronounced Superior to Brass Instrument by Rudy Wiedoeft," Vol. 73, No. 15, April 9, 1927, pg. 35
 "The Petrof Piano Saga" (feature story), Vol. 156, No. 12, January 2009, pps. 112–118: The article is an example of history and commentary works of the magazine

Historic reviews
 Harry Botsford (born 1890) wrote an article titled "Diversified Needs of the Trade Magazine," in The Editor (Ridgewood, New Jersey), Vol. 52, No. 7, April 10, 1920, pps. 4–5.  In it, he lauds The Music Trades as "one of the foremost publications which may be classed as a trade journal," and proceeds to examine a particular issue — Vol. 58, No. 25, December 20, 1919.  Botsford points out that the articles in the issue are diverse, but at first glance, seemingly not relevant for a lack of direct connections to the music field.  Yet he sees how topics of other sectors and industries — and commerce as a whole — relate to music commerce.  Botsford stated that the articles, all of them, were interesting and well-written; but averred that each writing assignment might have been better-filled by "a live writer in the field, if said writer would have used his brain."  Botsford, a trade writer himself, seemed to be challenging his profession to exercise more interdisciplinarity writing.  Referring to Secor's article, Botsford posed the question, "Why couldn't some of we fellows who write for farm papers have thought of the idea? Have we been overlooking possibilities?"

The December 20, 1919, issue, as a whole, bears some similarities to some of the special macro-economic issues of the 21st-century.  Botsford's review covered the following articles by authors, nearly all of whom were trade publication editors:

Regular features and sister publications 
 
The Music Trades: current annual cover stories, analyses, and awards "201X in Review" is published in the January issue
 "The NAMM Show Special" is published in the February issue, which are released every January — in sync with the annual January event
 "Music Industry Census," published in the April issue, is an annual cover story survey of dollar volume and unit data; in 2014, it the Census covered 65 product categories, including musical instruments and audio products
 "The Top 100," published in the April issue as part of the "Music Industry Census," is an analysis and recognition of the largest U.S. suppliers of music and audio gear ranked by sales volume
 "Retailing Around the World" is published in the May issue
 "The Retail Top 200," published in the August issue, is an analysis and recognition of the largest retailers in the United States
 "The Guitar Issue" is published in the October issue
 "The Global 225," published in the December issue, is an annual analysis and recognition of leading music and audio suppliers worldwideThe Music Trades: quarterly reports and analysis "Quarterly Retail Sales Data" — published in the March, June, September, and December issues — is a poll of U.S. retailers (over 1,000) on sales trends of product categories and regions
 "Quarterly Import Data" — published in the March, June, September, and December issues — is a statistical supply chain report and analysis of importsSeparate reportsThe Music Trades publishes current industry reports, data, and analyses — separate from the magazine — aimed at all constituents in the supply chain of music products.Sister publications The Purchaser's Guide to the Music Industries is published by The Music Trade Corporation.  It was first published in 1897 as The Piano Purchaser's Guide, but was soon renamed The Piano & Organ Purchaser's Guide for 19XX.  Sometime around the 1920s it was again renamed The Purchaser's Guide to the Music Industries, and absorbed The Piano & Organ Purchaser's Guide.  Since inception, it has been published annually and, for many of its early years was included with a subscription to either The Music Trades or Musical America.  The  edition of The Purchaser's Guide to the Music Industries is the  edition.
 Musical America, from 1898 to 1960 — when it was owned by Freund, then Trade Publications, Inc., then Majeski — was an affiliate publication

 Serial identification Volume numbers Weekly: 1891–1929
 The Music Trades — first published January 3, 1891, Vol. I, No. 1 — was a weekly publication from inception to February 9, 1929, Vol 77, No. 6.  The following issue, dated February 15, 1928, Vol. 77, No. 7, was the first monthly, followed by March 15, 1929, Vol. 77, No. 8.  As a weekly, the volume numbers changed every half year; i.e., the first half of 1924 — January 5 through June 28 — was published under Vol. 67, Nos. 1 through 26.  The latter half of 1924 — July 5 through December 27 — was published as Vol. 68, Nos. 1 through 26.

 Monthly: 1930–present
Beginning with February 1929, when the magazine became a monthly publication, the volume numbers changed every year, initially at January, but eventually at February. For February through December 1929, the Vol. was 77. The copyrights for those publications have expired.Trademarks"The Music Trades," as a standard character mark, is a US registered trademark. It was re-registered January 25, 2011, under Serial No. 85046105 and Registration no. 3910654. The registration officially reflects its (i) first use anywhere and (ii) first use in commerce on January 1, 1891.Volume notes Addresses 
During the 1890s, the executive office for The Music Trades was at 24 Union Square East, Manhattan, New York.  From around 1897 to 1915, it was at 135 Fifth Avenue at 20th Street — which, at the time, was at the heart of the wholesale music trade district in New York City.  From around 1915 to 1937, it was on Fifth Avenue — 505 (1915), 501 (1919). From about 1930 until the mid-1970s, the executive offices for The Music Trades were in Steinway Hall, 113 West 57th Street, Manhattan, New York.  From 1927 to 1929, when The Music Trades was owned by Trade Publications, Inc., the offices were at 235 East 45th Street, Manhattan, New York.  From the mid-1970s to present, the executive offices have been in Englewood, New Jersey.

 See also 
 The Colored American Magazine (re: involvement of John C. Freund)

ReferencesArchives, curated collections, and reproductionsOnline digital January 2011 – Present (monthly); The Sheridan Group
 Digital archives (incomplete), HathiTrust (digitized by Google)
 Full view — weekly (originals from Princeton University)
 Vol. 56 July 6 – December 28, 1918
 Vol. 57 January 4 – June 28, 1919
 Vol. 58 July 5 – December 27, 1919
 (lacking Vols. 59 & 60, Jan–Dec 1920)
 Vol. 61 January 1 – June 25, 1921
 Vol. 62 July 2 – December 31, 1921
 Vol. 64 July 1 – December 30, 1922

 Limited (search only; fee-based) — weekly (originals from Princeton University)
 Vol. 63 Jan–Jun 1922
 (lacking Vol. 64, Jul–Dec 1922)
 Vol. 65 Jan–Jun 1923
 Vol. 66 Jul–Dec 1923

 Limited (search only; fee-based) — monthly (originals from the University of Michigan)
 Vols. 123-136, 1975–1988

 Google Books (full online free access)
 Vol. 56 July 6 – December 28, 1918
 Vol. 57 January 4 – June 28, 1919
 Vol. 58 July 5 – December 27, 1919
 Vol. 64 July 1 – December 30, 1922

 Google Books (search only)
 Vol. 66, Issues 1–26, July 7 – December 29, 1923
 Vol. 126, Issues 1–6, January – June 1978

 Gale Group
 Beginning January 1989

 EBSCO Information Services
 January 2006 – presentMicroform AMS Press, Inc.
 Brooklyn Navy Yard
 35 mm positive microfilm
 Vols. 23–117, 1902–1969 – 63 reels; 
 (lacking 1906, 1911–1914, 1920) 
 AMS Press is the reprint publishing arm of
 Abrahams Magazine Service, Inc., Gabriel Hornstein, president
 Originals from the New York Public Library

 NCR Microcard Editions
 The National Cash Register Company
 Industrial Products Division
 901 26th St, NW
 Washington, D.C. 20037
 Vols. 1–117, 1890–1969
 Indian Head, Inc., acquired Microcards Editions from NCR on March 15, 1973, and operated it through its subsidiary, Information Handling Services (IHS), located in Englewood, Colorado

 University Microfilms International
 16 & 35 mm positive & negative microfilm
 Vols. 120–125, January 1972 – December 1977; 
 positive & negative microfiche
 Vol. 125, January – December 1977
 positive & negative microfiche or 16 & 35 mm microfilm
 Vol. 126, 1978
 
 Chadwyck-Healey; 
 Alexandria, Virginia
 Originals from the Boston Public Library
 (Chadwyck-Healey was acquired by ProQuest in 1999)

 Brookhaven Press
 La Crosse, Wisconsin
 35 mm positive & negative microfilm
 Vols. 1–120, 1890-1972
 (lacking 1890–1902, 1911–1914, 1920)Active trade journals older than The Music Trades

Other notes

Inline citations

External links 

 The Music Trades official website
NAMM Oral History Interview with John Majeski, Jr. January 13, 2003
NAMM Oral History Interview with Brian Majeski March 15, 2016

Englewood, New Jersey
Monthly magazines published in the United States
Music magazines published in the United States
Weekly magazines published in the United States
Magazines established in 1890
Magazines published in New Jersey
Music archives in the United States
Professional and trade magazines